Ladins can refer to:

Ladin people, an ethnic group in northern Italy
speakers of the Ladin language
Ladins Political Movement, a political party in South Tyrol